Lemannville is an unincorporated community and census-designated place in Ascension and St. James parishes, Louisiana, United States. Per the 2020 census, the population was 695.

Georgraphy

Demographics

Note: the US Census treats Hispanic/Latino as an ethnic category. This table excludes Latinos from the racial categories and assigns them to a separate category. Hispanics/Latinos can be of any race.

References

Census-designated places in Louisiana
Census-designated places in Ascension Parish, Louisiana
Census-designated places in St. James Parish, Louisiana